A supermarket is a self-service shop offering a wide variety of food, beverages and household products, organized into sections. This kind of store is larger and has a wider selection than earlier grocery stores, but is smaller and more limited in the range of merchandise than a hypermarket or big-box market. In everyday U.S. usage, however, "grocery store" is often used to mean "supermarket".

The supermarket typically has places for fresh meat, fresh produce, dairy, deli items, baked goods, etc. 
Shelf space is also reserved for canned and packaged goods and for various non-food items such as kitchenware, household cleaners, pharmacy products and pet supplies. Some supermarkets also sell other household products that are consumed regularly, such as alcohol (where permitted), medicine, and clothing, and some sell a much wider range of non-food products: DVDs, sporting equipment, board games, and seasonal items (e.g., Christmas wrapping paper in December).

A larger full-service supermarket combined with a department store is sometimes known as a hypermarket. Other services may include those of banks, cafés, childcare centers/creches, insurance (and other financial services), mobile phone services, photo processing, video rentals, pharmacies, and gas stations. If the eatery in a supermarket is substantial enough, the facility may be called a "grocerant", a blend of "grocery" and "restaurant".

The traditional supermarket occupies a large amount of floor space, usually on a single level. It is usually situated near a residential area in order to be convenient to consumers. The basic appeal is the availability of a broad selection of goods under a single roof, at relatively low prices. Other advantages include ease of parking and frequently the convenience of shopping hours that extend into the evening or even 24 hours of the day. Supermarkets usually allocate large budgets to advertising, typically through newspapers. They also present elaborate in-shop displays of products.

Supermarkets typically are chain stores, supplied by the distribution centers of their parent companies, thus increasing opportunities for economies of scale. Supermarkets usually offer products at relatively low prices by using their buying power to buy goods from manufacturers at lower prices than smaller stores can. They also minimise financing costs by paying for goods at least 30 days after receipt and some extract credit terms of 90 days or more from vendors. Certain products (typically staple foods such as bread, milk and sugar) are very occasionally sold as loss leaders so as to attract shoppers to their store. Supermarkets make up for their low margins by a high volume of sales, and with of higher-margin items bought by the attracted shoppers. Self-service with shopping carts (trolleys) or baskets reduces labor costs, and many supermarket chains are attempting further reduction by shifting to self-service check-out.

History

Historically, the earliest retailers were peddlers who marketed their wares in the streets, but by the 1920s, retail food sales in the United States had mostly shifted to small corner grocery stores.  In that era, the standard retail grocery business model was for a clerk to fetch products from shelves behind the merchant's counter while customers waited in front of the counter, indicating the items they wanted. Most foods and merchandise did not come in individually wrapped consumer-sized packages, so the clerk had to measure out and wrap the precise amount desired.  Merchants did not post prices, which forced customers to haggle and bargain with clerks to reach fair prices for their purchases.  This business model had already been established in Europe for several centuries.  It offered extensive opportunities for social interaction: many regarded this style of shopping as "a social occasion" and would often "pause for conversations with the staff or other customers".  

These practices were by nature slow, had high labor intensity, and were quite expensive. The number of customers who could be attended to at one time was limited by the number of staff employed in the store.  Shopping for groceries often also involved trips to multiple specialty shops, such as a greengrocer, butcher, bakery, fishmonger and dry goods store, in addition to a general store. Milk and other items of short shelf life were delivered by a milkman.

The concept of an inexpensive food market relying on economies of scale was developed by Vincent Astor. He founded the Astor Market in 1915, investing $750,000 of his fortune into a 165′ by 125′ (50×38-metre) corner of 95th and Broadway, Manhattan, creating, in effect, an open-air mini-mall that sold meat, fruit, produce and flowers. The expectation was that customers would come from great distances ("miles around"), but in the end, even attracting people from ten blocks away was difficult, and the market folded in 1917.

The Great Atlantic & Pacific Tea Company (A&P), which was established in 1859, was an early grocery store chain in Canada and the United States.  It became common in North American cities in the 1920s. Early chains like A&P did not sell fresh meats or produce. During the 1920s, to reduce the hassle of visiting multiple stores, U.S. grocery store chains like A&P introduced the combination store.  This was a grocery store which combined several departments under one roof, but generally maintained the traditional system of clerks pulling products from shelves on request.  By 1929, only one in three U.S. grocery stores was a combination store.  

The concept of a self-service grocery store predates the supermarket; it was developed by entrepreneur Clarence Saunders at his Piggly Wiggly stores, the first of which opened in 1916. Saunders was awarded several patents for the ideas he incorporated into his stores. The stores were a financial success and Saunders began to offer franchises.

The general trend since then has been to stock shelves at night so that customers, the following day, can obtain their own goods and bring them to the front of the store to pay for them. Although there is a higher risk of shoplifting, the costs of appropriate security measures ideally will be outweighed by reduced labor costs.

Historically, there has been much debate about the origin of the supermarket.  For example, Southern California grocery store chains Alpha Beta and Ralphs both have strong claims to the first supermarket.  By 1930, both chains were already operating multiple  self-service grocery stores.  However, as of 1930, both chains were not yet true supermarkets in the modern sense because their prices remained quite high; one of the most important defining features of the supermarket is cheap food.  Their main selling point was free parking.  Other strong contenders in Texas included Weingarten's and Henke & Pillot. 

To end the debate, the Food Marketing Institute in conjunction with the Smithsonian Institution and with funding from H.J. Heinz, researched the issue. They defined the attributes of a supermarket as "self-service, separate product departments, discount pricing, marketing and volume selling".  They determined that the first true supermarket in the United States was opened by a former Kroger employee, Michael J. Cullen, on 4 August 1930, inside a  former garage in Jamaica, Queens in New York City. The store, King Kullen, operated under the logic of "pile it high and sell it cheap".  Everything displayed for sale in the store "had prices clearly marked", meaning that consumers would no longer need to haggle over prices.  Cullen described his store as "the world's greatest price wrecker". At the time of his death in 1936, there were seventeen King Kullen stores in operation. Although Saunders had brought the world self-service, uniform stores, and nationwide marketing, Cullen built on this idea by adding separate food departments, selling large volumes of food at discount prices and adding a parking lot.  

Early supermarkets like King Kullen were called "cheapy markets" by industry experts at the time; this was soon replaced by the phrase "super market".  The compound phrase was then closed up to become the modern term "supermarket".  

Other established American grocery chains in the 1930s, such as Kroger and Safeway Inc. at first resisted Cullen's idea, but were eventually were forced to build their own supermarkets as the economy sank into the Great Depression.  American consumers became extraordinarily price-sensitive at a level never experienced before. Kroger took the idea one step further and pioneered the first supermarket surrounded on all four sides by a parking lot.  Once the large chains joined the supermarket trend, the new retail format swept across the nation like a wildfire. The number of American supermarkets almost tripled from 1,200 in 32 states in 1936 to over 3,000 in 47 states in 1937. One sign of the supermarket format's success in slashing labor costs, overhead, and food prices was that the percentage of disposable income spent by American consumers on food plunged "from 21 percent in 1930 to 16 percent in 1940".  The modern era of "cheap food" had begun. 

As large chain stores began to dominate the American grocery landscape with their low overhead and low prices (while crushing numerous independent small stores along the way), a backlash to this radical alteration of food distribution infrastructure appeared in the form of numerous anti-chain campaigns. The idea of "monopsony", proposed by Cambridge economist Joan Robinson in 1933, that a single buyer could outmaneuver a market of multiple sellers, became a strong anti-chain rhetorical device. With public backlash came political pressure to even the playing field for smaller vendors lacking the luxury of economies of scale. In 1936, the Robinson-Patman Act was implemented as a way of preventing such large chains from using their buying power to reap advantages over small stores, although the act was not well enforced and did not have much impact on such chains.

Supermarkets rapidly proliferated across both Canada and the United States with the growth of automobile ownership and suburban development after World War II. Most North American supermarkets are located in suburban strip shopping centers as an anchor store along with other smaller retailers. They are generally regional rather than national in their company branding. Kroger is the most nationally oriented supermarket chain in the United States, but it has preserved most of its regional brands, including Ralphs, City Market, King Soopers, Fry's, Smith's, and QFC.

In Canada, the largest such company is Loblaw, which operates stores under a variety of banners targeted to different segments and regions, including Fortinos, Zehrs, No Frills, the Real Canadian Superstore, and Loblaws, the foundation of the company. Sobeys is Canada's second largest supermarket with locations across the country, operating under many banners (Sobeys IGA in Quebec). Québec's first supermarket opened in 1934 in Montréal, under the banner Steinberg's.

In the United Kingdom, self-service shopping took longer to become established. Even in 1947, there were just ten self-service shops in the country. In 1951, ex-US Navy sailor Patrick Galvani, son-in-law of Express Dairies chairman, made a pitch to the board to open a chain of supermarkets across the country. The UK's first supermarket under the new Premier Supermarkets brand opened in Streatham, South London, taking ten times as much per week as the average British general store of the time. Other chains caught on, and after Galvani lost out to Tesco's Jack Cohen in 1960 to buy the 212 Irwin's chain, the sector underwent a large amount of consolidation, resulting in 'the big four' dominant UK of today: Tesco, Asda, Sainsbury's and Morrisons.

In the 1950s, supermarkets frequently issued trading stamps as incentives to customers. Today, most chains issue store-specific "membership cards", "club cards", or "loyalty cards". These typically enable the cardholder to receive special members-only discounts on certain items when the credit card-like device is scanned at check-out. Sales of selected data generated by club cards is becoming a significant revenue stream for some supermarkets.

Traditional supermarkets in many countries face intense competition from discounters such as Wal-Mart, Aldi and Lidl, which typically is non-union and operates with better buying power. Other competition exists from warehouse clubs such as Costco that offer savings to customers buying in bulk quantities. Superstores, such as those operated by Wal-Mart and Asda, often offer a wide range of goods and services in addition to foods. In Australia, Aldi, Woolworths and Coles are the major players running the industry with fierce competition among all the three. The rising market share of Aldi has forced the other two to cut prices and increase their private label product ranges. The proliferation of such warehouse and superstores has contributed to the continuing disappearance of smaller, local grocery stores; increased dependence on the automobile; suburban sprawl because of the necessity for large floor space and increased vehicular traffic. For example, in 2009 51% of Wal-Mart's $251 billion domestic sales were recorded from grocery goods. Some critics consider the chains' common practice of selling loss leaders to be anti-competitive. They are also wary of the negotiating power that large, often multinationals have with suppliers around the world.

Online-only supermarkets (21st century)

During the dot-com boom, Webvan, an online-only supermarket, was formed and went bankrupt after three years and was acquired by Amazon. The British online supermarket Ocado, which uses a high degree of automation in its warehouses, was the first successful online-only supermarket. Ocado expanded into providing services to other supermarket firms such as Waitrose and Morrisons.

Grocery stores such as Walmart employ food delivery services offered by third parties such as DoorDash. Other online food delivery services, such as Deliveroo in the United Kingdom, have begun to pay specific attention to supermarket delivery.

Delivery robots are offered by various companies partnering with supermarkets.

Micro-fulfillment centers (MFC) are relatively small warehouses with sophisticated automated rack-and-tote systems which prepare orders for pickup and delivery. Once the order is complete, the customer will pick it up (i.e. "click-and-collect") or have it fulfilled via home delivery. Supermarkets are investing in micro-fulfillment centers with the hope that automation can help reduce the costs of online commerce and ecommerce by shortening the distances from store to home and speeding up deliveries. In short, MFCs are said by many to be the key to profitably fulfilling online orders.

Types

U.S. categorization
The U.S. FMI food industry association, drawing on research by Willard Bishop, defines the following formats (store types) that sell groceries:

Organic and environmentally-friendly supermarkets
Some supermarkets are focusing on selling more (or even exclusively) organically certified produce. Others are trying to differentiate themselves by selling fewer (or no) products containing palm oil. This as the demand of palm oil is a main driver for the destruction of rainforests.
As a response to the growing concern on the heavy use of petroleum-based plastics for food packaging, so-called "zero waste" and "plastic-free" supermarkets and groceries are on the rise.

Growth in developing countries

Beginning in the 1990s, the food sector in developing countries has rapidly transformed, particularly in Latin America, South-East Asia, India, China and South Africa. With growth, has come considerable competition and some amount of consolidation. The growth has been driven by increasing affluence and the rise of a middle class; the entry of women into the workforce; with a consequent incentive to seek out easy-to-prepare foods; the growth in the use of refrigerators, making it possible to shop weekly instead of daily; and the growth in car ownership, facilitating journeys to distant stores and purchases of large quantities of goods. The opportunities presented by this potential have encouraged several European companies to invest in these markets (mainly in Asia) and American companies to invest in Latin America and China. Local companies also entered the market. Initial development of supermarkets has now been followed by hypermarket growth. In addition there were investments by companies such as Makro and Metro Cash and Carry in large-scale Cash-and-Carry operations.

While the growth in sales of processed foods in these countries has been much more rapid than the growth in fresh food sales, the imperative nature of supermarkets to achieve economies of scale in purchasing means that the expansion of supermarkets in these countries has important repercussions for small farmers, particularly those growing perishable crops. New supply chains have developed involving cluster formation; development of specialized wholesalers; leading farmers organizing supply, and farmer associations or cooperatives. In some cases supermarkets have organized their own procurement from small farmers; in others wholesale markets have adapted to meet supermarket needs.

Typical supermarket merchandise
Larger supermarkets in North America and in Europe typically sell many items among many brands, sizes and varieties. U.S. publisher Supermarket News lists the following categories, for example: Hypermarkets have a larger range of non-food categories such as clothing, electronics, household decoration and appliances.
Bakery (packaged and sometimes a service bakery and/or onsite bakery)
Beverages (non-alcoholic packaged, sometimes also alcoholic if laws permit)
Nonfood & Pharmacy (e.g. cigarettes, lottery tickets and over-the-counter medications (as laws permit), DVD rentals, books and magazines, including supermarket tabloids, greeting cards, toys, small selection of home goods like light bulbs, housewares (typically limited))
Personal care e.g. cosmetics, soap, shampoo 
Produce (fresh fruits and vegetables)
Floral (flowers and plants)
Deli (sliced meats, cheeses, etc.)
Prepared Foods (packaged and frozen foods)
Meat (fresh packaged, frozen, sometimes with a butcher service counter)
Seafood (fresh packaged, frozen, sometimes with a butcher service counter)
Dairy (milk products and eggs)
Center store (e.g. detergent, paper products, household cleaning supplies)
Multicultural (ethnic foods)
Bulk dried foods
Animal foods, toys and products

Layout strategies 

Most merchandise is already packaged when it arrives at the supermarket. Packages are placed on shelves, arranged in aisles and sections according to type of item. Some items, such as fresh produce, are stored in bins. Those requiring an intact cold chain are in temperature-controlled display cases.

While branding and store advertising will differ from company to company, the layout of a supermarket remains virtually unchanged. Although big companies spend time giving consumers a pleasant shopping experience, the design of a supermarket is directly connected to the in-store marketing that supermarkets must conduct to get shoppers to spend more money while there.

Every aspect of the store is mapped out and attention is paid to color, wording and even surface texture. The overall layout of a supermarket is a visual merchandising project that plays a major role. Stores can creatively use a layout to alter customers' perceptions of the atmosphere. Alternatively, they can enhance the store's atmospherics through visual communications (signs and graphics), lighting, colors, and even scents. For example, to give a sense of the supermarket being healthy, fresh produce is deliberately located at the front of the store. In terms of bakery items, supermarkets usually dedicate 30 to 40 feet of store space to the bread aisle.

Supermarkets are designed to "give each product section a sense of individual difference and this is evident in the design of what is called the anchor departments; fresh produce, dairy, delicatessen, meat and the bakery". Each section has different floor coverings, style, lighting and sometimes even individual services counters to allow shoppers to feel as if there are a number of markets within this one supermarket.

Marketers use well-researched techniques to try to control purchasing behavior. The layout of a supermarket is considered by some to consist of a few rules of thumb and three layout principles. The high-draw products are placed in separate areas of the store to keep drawing the consumer through the store. High impulse and high margin products are placed in the most predominant areas to grab attention. Power products are placed on both sides of the aisle to create increased product awareness, and end caps are used to receive a high exposure of a certain product whether on special, promotion or in a campaign, or a new line.

The first principle of the layout is circulation. Circulation is created by arranging product so the supermarket can control the traffic flow of the consumer. Along with this path, there will be high-draw, high-impulse items that will influence the consumer to make purchases which they did not originally intend. Service areas such as restrooms are placed in a location which draws the consumer past certain products to create extra buys. Necessity items such as bread and milk are found at the rear of the store to increase the start of circulation. Cashiers' desks are placed in a position to promote circulation. In most supermarkets, the entrance will be on the right-hand side because some research suggests that consumers who travel in a counter-clockwise direction spend more. However, other researchers have argued that consumers moving in a clockwise direction can form better mental maps of the store leading to higher sales in turn.

The second principle of the layout is coordination. Coordination is the organized arrangement of product that promotes sales. Products such as fast-selling and slow-selling lines are placed in strategic positions in aid of the overall sales plan. Managers sometimes place different items in fast-selling places to increase turnover or to promote a new line.

The third principle is consumer convenience. The layout of a supermarket is designed to create a high degree of convenience to the consumer to make the shopping experience pleasant and increase customer spending. This is done through the character of merchandising and product placement. There are many different ideas and theories in relation to layout and how product layout can influence the purchases made. One theory suggests that certain products are placed together or near one another that are of a similar or complementary nature to increase the average customer spend. This strategy is used to create cross-category sales similarity. In other words, the toothpaste is next to or adjacent the toothbrushes and the tea and coffee are down the same aisle as the sweet biscuits. These products complement one another and placing them near is one-way marketers try to increase purchases.

For vertical placement, cheap generic brands tend to be on the lowest shelves, products appealing to children are placed at the mid-thigh level, and the most profitable brands are placed at eye level.

The fourth principle is the use of color psychology, and the locations of the food, similar to its use in fast food branding.

Consumer psychologists suggest that most buyers tend to enter the store and shop to their right first. Some supermarkets, therefore, choose to place the entrance to the left-hand side as the consumer will likely turn right upon entry, and this allows the consumer to do a full anticlockwise circle around the store before returning to the checkouts. This suggests that supermarket marketers should use this theory to their advantage by placing their temporary displays of products on the right-hand side to entice you to make an unplanned purchase. Furthermore, aisle ends are extremely popular with product manufacturers, who pay top dollar to have their products located there. These aisle ends are used to lure customers into making a snap purchase and to also entice them to shop down the aisle. The most obvious place supermarket layout influences consumers are at the checkout. Small displays of chocolates, magazines, and drinks are located at each checkout to tempt shoppers while they wait to be served.

Criticisms
 The large scale of supermarkets, while often improving cost and efficiency for customers, can place significant economic pressure on suppliers and smaller shopkeepers.
 Supermarkets often generate considerable food waste, although modern technologies such as biomethanation units may be able to process the waste into an economical source of energy. Also, purchases tracking may help as supermarkets then become better able to size their stock (of perishable goods), reducing food spoilage.

See also 

 Hypermarket
 List of grocers
 Short food supply chains 
Farmers' markets
 Types of retail outlets
 Effects of the car on societies

References

Further reading

 Longstreth, R. W. (1999). The Drive-In, the Supermarket, and the Transformation of Commercial Space in Los Angeles, 1914-1941. The MIT Press.
 Lorr, B. (2020). The Secret Life of Groceries: The Dark Miracle of the American Supermarket. Avery.
 Newman, K. (2012). The Secret Financial Life of Food: From Commodities Markets to Supermarkets (Illustrated edition). Columbia University Press.
 Petroski, Henry (November–December 2005). "Shopping by Design". American Scientist 93 (6): 491.
 Sowell, Thomas. Basic Economics (Third Edition, 2007 Basic Books). Pages 92–94 describe the competition between the dominant grocery chains in the United States through the 20th century and beyond.
 Yee, A. (2003). Shopping at Giant Foods: Chinese American Supermarkets in Northern California (Illustrated edition). University of Washington Press.

External links

 Food Stories – Explore a century of revolutionary change in UK food culture on the British Library's Food Stories website
 groceteria.com – supermarket history and architecture from the 1920s to the 1970s
 Scrambling for customers, 4 August 2005, San Francisco Chronicle

American inventions
Food retailing